English singer Amanda Ghost has released one studio album, one extended play, six singles (including two as a featured artist), three promotional singles and three music videos.

Albums

Studio albums

Extended plays

Singles

As lead artist

As featured artist

Promotional singles

Music videos

References

External links
 
 
 

Discographies of British artists
Electronic music discographies
Pop music discographies